Josef Laštovka (born 20 February 1982 in Benešov) is a Czech football player.

References

External links
 
 
 
 

1982 births
Living people
Association football defenders
Czech footballers
Czech Republic youth international footballers
Czech First League players
FK Jablonec players
SK Dynamo České Budějovice players
FK Bohemians Prague (Střížkov) players
SpVgg Greuther Fürth players
SV Wacker Burghausen players
2. Bundesliga players
3. Liga players
Expatriate footballers in Germany
Czech expatriate sportspeople in Germany
FC DAC 1904 Dunajská Streda players
Slovak Super Liga players
Expatriate footballers in Slovakia
Czech expatriate sportspeople in Slovakia
People from Benešov
Sportspeople from the Central Bohemian Region